Brazil–Lithuania relations refers to the bilateral relations between Brazil and Lithuania. Both nations are members of the United Nations.

History

The first Lithuanian to set foot on Brazilian soil, according to a record dated in 1866, was a certain colonel Andrius Višteliauskas. His mission was to aid the Brazilian armed forces in the Paraguayan War that was going on at that time. Višteliauskas experience in Brazil may have influenced people in his homeland, perhaps by his writings or perhaps after he traveled home. A few years later a group of Lithuanian immigrants and their families arrived in Brazil. In 1890, twenty-five Lithuanian families entered the land of Brazil. Their destination was the newly established colony of Ijuí, situated on the red and fertile soil of the northwestern part of the state of Rio Grande do Sul. Between 1920 and 1930, there was a community of 30,000 Lithuanians residing in Brazil.

In 1921, Brazil recognized Lithuania's independence, however, Lithuania was occupied and incorporated into the Soviet Union in 1944. Brazil re-recognized Lithuania's independence on 5 November, 1991 after the Dissolution of the Soviet Union. 

In March 1996, Lithuanian Prime Minister, Algirdas Brazauskas, paid an official visit to Brazil. In November 2002, Brazilian Foreign Minister, Celso Lafer, paid a visit to Lithuania. In July 2008, Lithuanian President, Valdas Adamkus, paid an official visit to Brazil and signed an Agreement of Cultural Cooperation between the two nations. In June 2012, Lithuanian President, Dalia Grybauskaitė, paid a visit to Brazil to attend the United Nations Conference on Sustainable Development in Rio de Janeiro.

In 2011, Brazil opened an honorary consulate in Vilnius. In 2012, Lithuania closed its embassy in Buenos Aires, Argentina (its only embassy in Latin America), and opened a consulate-general in São Paulo soon afterwards. São Paulo is the second largest community in the Lithuanian diaspora in Latin America, after Buenos Aires.

High-level visits

High-level visits from Brazil to Lithuania
 Foreign Minister Celso Lafer (2002)

High-level visits from Lithuania to Brazil
 Prime Minister Algirdas Brazauskas (1996)
 President Valdas Adamkus (2008)
 President Dalia Grybauskaitė (2012)
 Foreign Minister Linas Antanas Linkevičius (2015)

Diaspora
Between 200,000 and 300,000 Brazilians are of Lithuanian descent, making Brazil the second country with the largest Lithuanian community abroad (after the United States).

Resident diplomatic missions

 Brazil is accredited to Lithuania from its embassy in Copenhagen, Denmark and maintains an honorary consulate in Vilnius.
 Lithuania has a consulate-general in São Paulo.

See also
 Foreign relations of Brazil 
 Foreign relations of Lithuania
 Lithuanian Brazilians

References

 

Brazil–Lithuania relations
Lithuania
Brazil